Tessa Peake-Jones (born 9 May 1957) is an English actress who has appeared in The Danedyke Mystery (1979), Pride and Prejudice (1980), When We Are Married (1987), Up the Garden Path (1990–1993), So Haunt Me (1992–1994),  (1996–1998),  (1997), Summer in the Suburbs (2000), Poppy Shakespeare (2008), Doctors (2009–2011) and Unforgotten (2015).

Peake-Jones may be best known for her role as Raquel in the BBC sitcom Only Fools and Horses, between 1988 and 2003, Tawny Owl in the animated series The Animals of Farthing Wood and as Mrs. Maguire in Grantchester (2014-2022).

Early life and education
Peake-Jones was born on 9 May 1957 in London, to her mother Mary. She was raised in Hammersmith and educated at Kenmore Park Junior School, Harrow and Downer Grammar School (now known as Canons High School), leaving in 1973, before training at the Central School of Speech and Drama.

Television
Peake-Jones is best known for playing Raquel Turner, the longtime partner of main character Derek "Del Boy" Trotter (played by David Jason) in the television comedy Only Fools and Horses from 1988–1993, 1996 and 2001–2003. She starred to voice Tawny Owl in the animated series The Animals of Farthing Wood, rather than Sally Grace.

She had a costarring role in the 1999 television series Births, Marriages, and Deaths. Her other television appearances include The Demon Headmaster, Midsomer Murders, Casualty, Holby City, The Bill, Up the Garden Path and So Haunt Me.

She appeared in the BBC adaptation of Iris Murdoch's The Bell (1982). She also played the role of the bookish sister Mary Bennet in the BBC serial adaptation of Pride and Prejudice (1980). In March 2008, she appeared as a member of staff in the Channel 4 psychiatric hospital drama Poppy Shakespeare. 

In both 2009 and 2011, Peake-Jones played Sue Bond in the BBC daytime soap opera Doctors. In 2013, she appeared in the Doctor Who Christmas episode "The Time of the Doctor" playing a character called Marta. Since 2014, she has appeared in Grantchester as Sylvia Maguire, the vicar's religious and cantankerous housekeeper.

In 2019, Peake-Jones appeared on the ITV show All Star Musicals, singing "Mamma Mia" from the musical Mamma Mia!.

Personal life
Peake-Jones' former partner is actor Douglas Hodge, from whom she separated in February 2013 after 27 years together. They have two children, Charlie and Molly-Rose.

Filmography

Film

Television

References

External links
 
 Exploring Grantchester character of Mrs. Maguire played by Tessa Peake-Jones

1957 births
20th-century English actresses
21st-century English actresses
Actresses from London
Alumni of the Royal Central School of Speech and Drama
British comedy actresses
English television actresses
English film actresses
Living people
People from Hammersmith
People educated at Canons High School